Alppikylä (literally means the "Alpine village") is a neighborhood in the northeastern part of Helsinki, Finland. It is located between the Tattarisuo neighborhood and the Helsinki–Lahti Highway (E75), near the Helsinki–Malmi Airport. It is classified as belonging to the Suurmetsä district. At the beginning of 2017, the area had a population of 1,478.

History 
The former building stock of Alppikylä is wooden houses with large gardens. The area got its name when the undulating terrain merged with the Alps in people's minds. The old road north of Helsinki curved past the high cliff of Jakomäki, which is also called Alppikallio (literally "Alpine rock". At its foot was a village that came to be called Alppikylä.

In the 19th century, a bus passed from Alppikallio from Helsinki to Vantaa's Hakkila, where the route merged with the King's Road from Turku to Vyborg. There is a rocky milestone along the Alppikyläntie from the old thoroughfare. The milestone and the four pines nearby are protected by a town plan.

Buildings and services 

Alppikylä is well-known for its colorful townhouses. Most of the current buildings were built in a construction project in 2011–2016, where apartment buildings and densely populated townhouses will be built in Alppikylä.

The services of the residential area include a kindergarten, which was opened in the building completed at the beginning of August 2016 on the Alppikylänkatu street, and a Lidl grocery store.

See also 
 Jakomäki

References

External links 

 Mikä ihmeen Alppikylä? – Uutta Helsinkiä (in Finnish)
 Moni-ilmeinen Alppikylä Helsingissä at YouTube

Neighbourhoods of Helsinki